Scottish synth-pop band Chvrches have released four studio albums, three extended plays (EPs), 21 singles, two promotional singles and 19 music videos. Chvrches was formed in Glasgow in 2011 and consists of Lauren Mayberry (lead vocals, additional synthesisers, samplers), Iain Cook (synthesisers, guitar, bass, vocals), and Martin Doherty (synthesisers, samplers, vocals).

Chvrches came fifth on the BBC's Sound of 2013 list of the most promising new music talent. In March 2013, they released Recover EP. Their debut studio album The Bones of What You Believe was released on 20 September 2013.

Studio albums

Extended plays

Singles

As lead artist

As featured artist

Promotional singles

Other charted songs

Covers

Remixes

Music videos

Notes

References

External links
 
 
 
 

Discographies of British artists
Electronic music discographies